The 1931 Rice Owls football team was an American football team that represented Rice University as a member of the Southwest Conference (SWC) during the 1931 college football season. In its third season under head coach Jack Meagher, the team compiled a 6–4 record (3–3 against SWC opponents) and was outscored by a total of 178 to 66.

Schedule

References

Rice
Rice Owls football seasons
Rice Owls football